was a village located in Minamiaizu District, Fukushima Prefecture, Japan. It was popular with city dwellers for its plentiful hot springs and skiing/snowboarding.

As of 2003, the village had an estimated population of 2,275 and a density of 8.63 persons per km². The total area was 263.55 km².

On March 20, 2006, Tateiwa, along with town of Tajima, and the villages of Ina and Nangō (all from Minamiaizu District), was merged to create the town of Minamiaizu.

External links
 Minamiaizu official website 

Dissolved municipalities of Fukushima Prefecture
Minamiaizu, Fukushima